Gary Battistella (13 January 1940 – 12 December 2007) was a Canadian alpine skier who competed in the 1964 Winter Olympics.

References

1940 births
2007 deaths
Canadian male alpine skiers
Olympic alpine skiers of Canada
Alpine skiers at the 1964 Winter Olympics